Ghost Sweepers (also known as The Fortune Tellers) is a 2012 South Korean comedy horror film about a group of shamans from across the nation who gather together for a grand exorcism at a small village notorious for dark spirits, as a young journalist gets sent to cover the story.

Plot
The village of Uljinri has been plagued by evil for decades. When mysterious accidents and events keep happening without avail, shamans from all over the country gather to hold a shaman ritual, and Chan-young, a young newspaper reporter is sent to cover the story.

The group of shamans begins their grand ritual, but with the strange eerie force that dominates the entire village and repeated attacks by the spirits, most of the shamans run for their lives. Only the five best shamans remain: Teacher Park, the most famous "star fortune teller" who gets paid for performing exorcisms around the country; Monk Shim-in, who studied with him under the same master but is now telling sundry couple's fortunes around old Tabgol Park; Suk-hyun who has a doctorate in engineering and makes all kinds of demon-chasing equipment; a boy named Wol-kwang, who has the power to see into the near future; and Seung-hee who is skilled at tarot cards and can see the memories stored in all objects. Along with Chan-young, the six begin to explore the dark secrets of the village while preparing for the biggest battle against the evil forces.

Cast

Kim Su-ro - Teacher Park
Kang Ye-won - Chan-young
Lee Je-hoon - Suk-hyun
Kwak Do-won - Monk Shim-in
Kim Yoon-hye (formerly Woori) - Seung-hee
Yang Kyung-mo - Wol-kwang
Lee Byung-joon - Ko-san
Kim Gi-cheon - Teacher Choong-ryeol
Lee Sang-hee - village foreman
Lee Jun-hyeok - killer
Jung Yoon-min - Mr. Kim
Go Seo-hee - Female shaman Poonghyangryoo
Bang Joon-seo - young Chan-young 
Jin Yong-ok - editor
Kim Ji-hoon - Il-kwang
Kim Min-kyo - police officer in Uljin
Lee Mi-do - Joon-kyung (cameo)
Choi Won-young - Choi Seung-woo (cameo)
Kim Tae-hoon - young male ghost (cameo)
Jeremy Lowe - Father Bob

References

External links 
  
 
 
 

2012 horror films
2012 comedy horror films
South Korean comedy horror films
2010s supernatural horror films
Next Entertainment World films
2010s Korean-language films
2012 films
2012 comedy films
2010s South Korean films